Islam Uddin is an Indian politician belonging to the Communist Party of India (Marxist) (CPI (M)). He is a Member of Legislative Assembly (MLA) representing Kadamtala-Kurti Assembly constituency in the North Tripura district and East region of Tripura.

Early life and political career 
Islam Uddin contested the 2018 Tripura Legislative Assembly election on a CPI (M) ticket from North Tripura and garnered 57.73% of the votes at 20,721. He was elected over Giyas Uddin Choudhary of the Nationalist Congress Party and Tinku Roy of the Bharatiya Janata Party. They got 936 and 13,839 votes respectively out of the total votes polled.

References 

Living people
Communist Party of India (Marxist) politicians from Tripura
People from North Tripura district
Year of birth missing (living people)
20th-century Bengalis
21st-century Bengalis